Salvador de Madariaga y Rojo (23 July 1886 – 14 December 1978) was an "eminent liberal" Spanish diplomat, writer, historian, and pacifist, nominated for the Nobel Prize in Literature and the Nobel Peace Prize and awarded the Charlemagne Prize in 1973.

Background
Salvador de Madariaga y Rojo was born on July 23, 1886, in A Coruña, Galicia, Kingdom of Spain.  He graduated with a degree in engineering in Paris, France.

Career
Madariaga returned to Spain and became an engineer for the Northern Spanish Railway Company.  At that time, he first came into contact with "Generación del 14" intellectuals.

In 1916, he abandoned that for work in London as a journalist for The Times newspaper.  Meanwhile, he began publishing his first essays. In 1921, he became a press member of the Secretariat of the League of Nations and chief of the Disarmament Section in 1922. In 1928, he was appointed Professor of Spanish at Oxford University for three years during which he wrote a book on nation psychology, Englishmen, Frenchmen, Spaniards.

In 1931, the first Spanish Republic appointed Madariaga as Spanish ambassador to the United States and a permanent delegate to the League of Nations; he kept the latter post for five years. Chairing the Council of the League of Nations in January 1932, he condemned Japanese aggression in Manchuria in such vehement terms that he was nicknamed "Don Quijote de la Manchuria".  From 1932 to 1934, he served as ambassador to France. In 1933, he was elected to the National Congress and served as both Minister for Education and Minister for Justice.

In July 1936, as a classical liberal he went into exile in England to escape the Spanish Civil War. There, he became a vocal opponent of and organised resistance to the Nationalists and the Spanish State of Francisco Franco.

In 1947, he was one of the principal authors of the Oxford Manifesto on liberalism. He participated in the Hague Congress in 1948 as president of the Cultural Commission and he was one of the co-founders in 1949 of the College of Europe.

In his writing career he wrote books and essays about Don Quixote, Christopher Columbus, Shakespeare's Hamlet, and the history of Latin America. He militated in favour of a united and integrated Europe. He wrote in French and German, Spanish, Galician (his mother tongue) and English.

In 1973, he won the Karlspreis for his contributions to the European idea and European peace. In 1976, he returned to Spain after Franco's death, and became a member of the Spanish Royal Academy.

Personal life and death

In 1912 de Madariaga married Constance Archibald, a Scottish economic historian. The couple had two daughters, Nieves Mathews (1917–2003) and professor and historian Isabel de Madariaga (1919–2014). Constance died in May 1970.  In November 1970, de Madariaga married Emilia Székely de Rauman who had been his secretary since 1938 (who died in 1991, aged 83).

Salvador de Madariaga y Rojo died age 92 on December 16 1978, in Locarno, Switzerland.

Awards and recognition

Madariaga received numerous prizes in his lifetime, including:
 Honorary Member of the Royal Academy of Spain (1936)
 Hansischer Goethe-Preis, University of Hamburg (1972)
 Charlemagne Prize (1973)

Legacy
The Madariaga European Foundation has been named after him and promotes his vision of a united Europe making for a more peaceful world. The 1979–1980 academic year at the College of Europe was named in his honour.

An Oxfordshire blue plaque in honour of Salvador de Madariaga was unveiled at 3 St Andrew's Road, Headington, Oxford by his daughter Isabel on 15 October 2011.

Works

Madariaga wrote books in Spanish, English, French, and German.  His best known is the novel El Corazón de Piedra Verde (Heart of Jade).

Selected books
 The Sacred Giraffe: Being the Second Volume of the Posthumous Works of Julio Arceval (1925) (science fiction novel)
 Englishmen, Frenchmen, Spaniards: An Essay in Comparative Psychology, Oxford University Press, 1929
 Disarmament, Coward-McCann, 1929
 Anarchy or Hierarchy, Macmillan, 1937
 Christopher Columbus, Macmillan, 1940
 The Rise of the Spanish-American Empire, Hollis & Carter; Macmillan, 1947
 The Fall of the Spanish-American Empire, Hollis & Carter, 1947; Macmillan, 1948
 Bolivar, Hollis & Carter, 1952
 Morning without Noon, 1973
 El Corazón de Piedra Verde, 1942 (Heart of Jade)
 War in the Blood (sequel to Heart of Jade)
 Spain: a Modern History
 Hernán Cortés – Conqueror of Mexico, Macmillan, 1941
 The Blowing up of the Parthenon, 1960
 On Hamlet, Hollis & Carter, 1948
 Latin America, Between the Eagle and the Bear, Praeger, 1962

Articles
 "Englishman, Frenchman, Spaniard," The Atlantic (April 1928)
 "An Admirable Variety: Further Diversities of National Character," The Atlantic (September 1928)
 "Disarmament--American Plan," The Atlantic (April 1929)
 "Spain: The Politics," The Atlantic (March 1937)

See also

 Contributions to liberal theory
 List of peace activists

References

External links
 Madariaga – College of Europe Foundation 
 Madariaga tennis Club in A Coruña.
 Madariaga European College.
 Archival sources by and on Salvador de Madariaga can be consulted at the Historical Archives of the European Union in Florence
 
 Washington Post obituary

1886 births
1978 deaths
People from A Coruña
Autonomous Galician Republican Organization politicians
Justice ministers of Spain
Members of the Congress of Deputies of the Second Spanish Republic
20th-century Spanish historians
Spanish pacifists
Spanish writers in French
Spanish writers in German
English-language writers
Members of the Royal Spanish Academy
Presidents of the Liberal International
Permanent Representatives of Spain to the League of Nations
Exiles of the Spanish Civil War in the United Kingdom
Ambassadors of Spain to France
Ambassadors of Spain to the United States
Spanish expatriates in Switzerland
Spanish expatriates in England
Alumni of the University of Oxford
Exiles of the Spanish Civil War in Switzerland
Spanish political writers
20th-century Spanish male writers
Spanish expatriates in the United Kingdom
Grand Crosses of the Order of the White Lion
Member of the Mont Pelerin Society